Yitong is a town and the county seat of Yitong Manchu Autonomous County in western Jilin province, China.

References
www.xzqh.org 

Township-level divisions of Jilin